Adrenal crisis is a potentially life-threatening medical condition requiring immediate emergency treatment. It is a constellation of symptoms (caused by insufficient levels of the hormone cortisol) that indicate severe adrenal insufficiency. This may be the result of either previously undiagnosed or untreated Addison's disease, a disease process suddenly affecting adrenal function (such as bleeding from the adrenal glands in Waterhouse–Friderichsen syndrome), suddenly stopping intake of glucocorticoids or an intercurrent problem (e.g. infection, trauma, in fact any form of physical or mental stress) in someone known to have Addison's disease, congenital adrenal hyperplasia (CAH), or other form of primary adrenal insufficiency.

Signs and symptoms
Characteristic symptoms are:
 Sudden penetrating pain in the legs, lower back or abdomen
 Confusion, psychosis, slurred speech
 Severe lethargy
 Convulsions
 Fever
 Hyperkalemia (elevated potassium level in the blood)
 Hypercalcemia (elevated calcium level in the blood): the cause of hypercalcemia is a combination of increased calcium input into the extracellular space and reduced calcium removal by the kidney, this last caused by decreased glomerular filtration and increased tubular calcium reabsorption. Both renal factors are secondary to volume depletion and, in fact, improve rapidly during rehydration with saline infusion.
 Hypoglycemia (reduced level of blood glucose)
 Hyponatremia (low sodium level in the blood)
 Hypotension (low blood pressure)
 Hypothyroidism (low T4 level)
 Severe vomiting and diarrhea, resulting in dehydration
 Syncope (transient loss of consciousness) and/or orthostatic hypotension (drop in blood pressure on standing, leading to loss of balance)

Causes
Adrenal crisis is caused by a deficiency of cortisol resulting from Addison's disease, congenital adrenal hyperplasia (CAH), corticosteroid biosynthetic enzyme defects or pituitary disorders (such as Sheehan's syndrome, pituitary adenoma, hypopituitarism (inactive or underactive pituitary) causing failure to activate the adrenal glands. May also be a side effect of Zytiga (Abiraterone) for prostate cancer.

Diagnosis
Various investigations aid the diagnosis:
 ACTH (cosyntropin) stimulation test
 Cortisol level (to assess the level of glucocorticoids)
 Fasting blood sugar
 Serum potassium (to assess the level of mineralocorticoids)
 Serum sodium

Prevention
Adrenal crisis is triggered by physiological stress (such as trauma) or severe psychological stress. Activities that have an elevated risk of trauma are best avoided. Treatment must be given within two hours of trauma and consequently it is advisable to carry injectable hydrocortisone in remote areas.

Treatment
Acute adrenal insufficiency is a medical emergency and needs to be treated with injectable hydrocortisone and fluid support.

 1L of 0.9% saline over 30-60 min with 100 mg of i.v. Bolus hydrocortisone.
 Continuous infusion of saline within 24hours with 100 mg I.m. hydrocortisone 6-hourly.
 Glucose
 To be shifted to oral medication based on the patient's state. Hydrocortisone 20 mg 8-hourly reduced to 20–30 mg in divided doses over few days.
 Fludrocortisone is given later.

Epidemiology
Hahner et al. investigated the frequency, causes and risk factors for adrenal crisis in patients with chronic adrenal insufficiency.

See also
 Stress dose

References

External links 
 Acute adrenal crisis on PubmedHealth
 Adrenal Crisis on Patient.info

Medical emergencies
Adrenal gland disorders